is a Japanese politician and member of the Komeito Party of Japan and former Senior Vice Minister for the Reconstruction Agency. He resigned in September 2017 after letting a female acquaintance use a housing complex reserved for lawmakers.

Early life
Nagasawa was born on August 19, 1958 in Tokyo, and studied sociology at Toyo University.

Political career
In 1983, Nagasawa joined the Komei Shimbun, which was the official newspaper of the Komeito. He was first elected to the House of Representatives in 2003.

Nagasawa served in the House of Councillors from 2010 to 2017, having been re-elected in July 2016. Following his resignation, he was replaced as Senior Vice Minister by Masayoshi Hamada.

References

External links
Official website (archived)

1958 births
Komeito politicians
Members of the House of Councillors (Japan)
Government ministers of Japan
Living people